South Carolina Highway 265 (SC 265) is a  primary state highway in the U.S. state of South Carolina. It connects Jefferson with the cities of Kershaw and Chesterfield.

Route description
SC 265 is a two-lane rural highway that traverses  from U.S. Route 601 (US 601) north of Kershaw to SC 9 near Ruby.

History

The highway was established in 1928 as a new primary routing from SC 26 in Kershaw to SC 9 near Ruby. In 1940, it was extended southwest to SC 97 in Liberty Hill. In 1948, it was reduced back to its original route from 1928-1940. In 1951 or 1952, SC 265 was shortened to its current eastern terminus with US 601.

Junction list

See also

References

External links

SC 265 at Virginia Highways' South Carolina Highways Annex

265
Transportation in Lancaster County, South Carolina
Transportation in Chesterfield County, South Carolina